Dimensions is the second extended play (EP) by Australian rock band Wolfmother, released on 31 January 2006. It includes a total of four tracks and two music videos; three of the four songs were previously released on the band's self-titled album (one, "Love Train", only on the international version).

Track listing
All songs were written by Andrew Stockdale, Chris Ross and Myles Heskett.
"Dimension" – 4:23
"Mind's Eye" – 4:57
"Love Train" – 3:02
"The Earth's Rotation Around the Sun" – 2:45
"Dimension" (music video) – 4:23
"Mind's Eye" (music video) – 4:57

Credits
Wolfmother
Andrew Stockdale – lead vocals, guitar
Chris Ross – bass, keyboard
Myles Heskett – drums
Additional personnel
Dave Sardy – production
Frank Frazetta – cover art
Jonathan Zawada – layout design

References

Wolfmother albums
2006 EPs
Albums with cover art by Frank Frazetta